Seth, in comics, may refer to:

 Seth (Marvel Comics), a Marvel Comics villain based on the Egyptian god
 Seth, a Wildstorm character who appeared in the Authority storylines "Brave New World" and "Transfer Of Power"
 Seth, a character from the X-Men
 Seth Voder, a DC Comics character who appeared in Batman stories

It may also refer to a number of comic creators:

 Seth (cartoonist), a Canadian cartoonist known for works such as Palookaville
 Seth Fisher, a comic book artist known for his work at DC
 Seth Damoose, an American comic artist

See also
Seth (disambiguation)
Set (Marvel Comics), a Conan character who had a wide role in the Marvel Comics adaptations

References